För kärlekens skull is a 2003 Christer Sjögren studio album.

Track listing
För kärlekens skull
Jag ger dig min morgon (I Give You the Morning)
Jag älskar bara mer
Kärleken förde oss samman
När morgonen gryr
Så skimrande var aldrig havet
Morgon på Kungsholmen
Älska mig
Somliga går med trasiga skor
En valsmelodi
Den första gång jag såg dig
Kärleksvals
I folkviseton
Ack Värmeland du sköna

Contributors
Christer Sjögren - vocals
Per Lindvall - drums
Peter Ljung - piano, keyboard
Thobias Gabrielsson, bass
Henrik Janson, Ulf Janson, guitar, keyboard

Charts

References 

2003 albums
Christer Sjögren albums